The 1977 Individual Ice Speedway World Championship was the 12th edition of the World Championship  The Championship was held on 5/6 March 1977 in Inzell, Germany.

The winner was Sergey Tarabanko of the Soviet Union for the third successive year.

Final 
 March 5–6
  Inzell

See also 
 1977 Individual Speedway World Championship in classic speedway

References 

Ice speedway competitions
Ice